Ultimo is a robot character appearing in American comic books published by Marvel Comics. He was once controlled by the Mandarin and has fought Iron Man several times.

Publication history

Ultimo made a cameo appearance in Tales of Suspense #76 (April 1966) and its first full appearance was in Tales of Suspense #77 (May 1966), and was created by Stan Lee and Gene Colan.

Comic Book Resources rated Ultimo at #10 on their list of "Marvel's 10 Most Powerful Giants," referring to him as "a doomsday weapon created by a long-destroyed alien culture."

Fictional character biography

Origin
Ultimo is a gigantic android that is thousands of years old. Ultimo was constructed by an alien species that has since been destroyed by their own creation, which they called "The doomsday device," apparently a combat instrument and a weapon of mutually assured destruction. Ultimo confirmed that his "masters" had not contacted him in "thousands of years."

The first time (chronologically speaking) he is depicted in print, Ultimo is already travelling through space, and has attacked the planet Rajak, ultimately killing all its people. The only survivors, a group of merchants who were off-planet at the time, attempted to destroy him but had to flee before his might. Ultimately, they managed to lure him into an asteroid belt, where space rocks battered both him and the ship until they were driven off-course and separately crash-landed on an unknown planet — Earth. This happened around the 1840s.

First appearance
The Mandarin first reveals Ultimo as his "greatest creation"; later issues suggest that the Mandarin found Ultimo in a long-dormant volcano in the vicinity of the "Palace of the Star Dragon" in the "Valley of the Spirits", somewhere in Communist China, and then reprogrammed him as a servant. The Mandarin charged it with geothermal energy inside a volcano and gave him its current name. The giant robot vanquishes a force of Chinese soldiers sent to dispatch the Mandarin and nearly destroys Iron Man, but is drawn back into the volcano. The volcano has been destabilized by his activity and erupts, swallowing the robot whole in a conflagration of red-hot lava. This proved not to be enough to destroy him, however.

Ultimo is then sent by the Mandarin to assist the Living Laser who was attacking Africa, and battled Thor and Hawkeye after emerging from a volcano. He was able to separate Thor from Mjolnir, briefly causing the Asgardian to be Donald Blake, but Hawkeye distracted him long enough for Blake to transform back to Thor, after which Ultimo was knocked into the volcano, which Thor closed. Ultimo was then sent by the Mandarin to attack the Yellow Claw and Loc Do, and battled Iron Man and Sunfire. Ultimo was next sent by the Mandarin to attack Washington, D.C. Ultimo fights both Iron Man and the rest of the Avengers, even on the Capitol Mall, before finally being dumped in yet another volcano. He is not heard from for years after that, until he's revealed to be the cause for a series of earth tremors in California. Over the years, he has drifted across the entire length of the continental plate, soaking up gigantic amounts of geothermal energy, and is thus "for the first time in centuries, fully charged". The then-current version of Iron Man (the remote-controlled NTU-150) proves no match for Ultimo, and is torn to pieces — and the cybernetic backlash to the nervous system renders Tony Stark comatose.

Ultimo versus Iron Legion
Ultimo battled the "Iron Legion" which was led by War Machine (Jim Rhodes) and furthermore comprised Happy Hogan, Eddie March (in Iron Man's gray, original suit), Bethany Cabe, Mike O'Brien (in Iron Man's Silver Centurion suit) and Carl Walker (in Iron Man's "classic" armor); Tony was down and Rhodes had Abe Zimmer take Iron Man's old armors out of storage to be nominally functional again. Since Iron Man's armors would not function anywhere near capacity (having been stored for sentimental reasons only with the idea of never being used again), Rhodes decided on a change of plan against Ultimo. While Happy gets Carl and Eddie to the hospital, and Bethany and Mike head to the town of Futura to start evacuations, Bethany convinced Rhodes to allow to buy time against Ultimo together. At this point, Tony came out of a coma and donned the new Modular Iron Man suit. He headed out to aid in the fight against Ultimo with a Full-Spectrum Scanalyzer and Railgun Launcher. Iron Man successfully took out Ultimo single-handedly, by causing a lightning bolt to strike the robot's "central nervous system". Iron Man's scans indicated that Ultimo is several thousand years old, and has the robot hauled off for study.

Ultimate Devastation
Years later, the robot is the property of Stark-Fujikawa which had bought the Stark company when Tony was believed dead (after the events of "the Crossing"). Having performed extensive research of the hulking, inert robot, Stark-Fujikawa's engineers managed to access its control programs, and now the company intends to use the enormous energy reserves stored inside Ultimo to provide cheap electricity to the entire Western USA.

The ship built on top of the dormant doomsday device is attacked by Goldenblade and Sapper — ironically, representatives of the doomed Rajaki race, seeking to steal energy to resurrect those Rajaki that still survive as data patterns aboard the crashed vessel - who accidentally wake up Ultimo, and the robot immediately sets out to destroy the ship. Unfortunately, the city of Spokane is on his route, and will be destroyed unless he's stopped. Goldenblade, Sapper, the superheroine Warbird, S.H.I.E.L.D. and the US army all work together with Iron Man to slow the giant down, while Iron Man attempts to use what data Stark-Fujikawa's engineers managed to obtain to break into Ultimo's core programming once more. Moments before the city is reached, Tony manages to convince the giant killer robot of being one of his "Masters" and orders him to shut down. Afterward, Ultimo is dismantled and his systems "fried" by the transfer of his energy stores to the Rajaki vessel.

Initiative
Ultimo reappeared, apparently fully restored, facing the Mighty Avengers - just long enough to be deactivated by a single shot of the Tactigon, a weapon of unknowable power (at the time) in the hands of a girl called Armory.

Ultimo virus
Ultimo gets converted into an "Ultimo virus" capable of bestowing enhanced strength, speed, regeneration and optic blast abilities to its victims, which included Dr. Glenda Sandoval (Rhodey's former love interest) and Ares. It is revealed that the virus was engineered from Ultimo himself by the Human Engineering Life Laboratories, which was acting on the commission of the Stark Solutions corporation, which had been contracted by H.A.M.M.E.R. to study Ultimo's potential as a weapon. Having destroyed Ultimo's body, War Machine sets out to destroy Ultimo's brain, which had been split up into three discrete units stored at separate locations. Two of the units are destroyed by War Machine's allies, but the third is ingested (in the form of a crystalline liquid) by Stark Solutions' CEO Morgan Stark who is transformed into a giant, humanoid (quicksilver-like) Ultimo and possessed of the Doomsday Machine's programming to destroy all life, fighting War Machine. However, Ultimo's third component is destroyed when War Machine uses Ultimo's own weapons technology - which were obtained when the robot's body was destroyed - against the robot. Morgan then self-destructs, scattering Ultimo's liquid body all over the landscape and merging with the plant life. Ultimo/Morgan planned to convert all of the vegetation on Earth into metal which would suffocate all life within two weeks. War Machine renders Ultimo docile by forcing Norman Osborn into showing memories of respective happiest moments. However, Osborn then took advantage of this to take Ultimo for himself. Ultimo (having had his core programming erased) turned into a giant, floating ball of liquid metal that was essentially awaiting instructions. Before Osborn could take possession of the robot, War Machine interfered and then requested Cybermancer Suzi Endo to take Ultimo to "raise" the blank slate it now is, hopefully instilling other values into the artificial intelligence besides universal genocide. But on War Machine's request, drops of Ultimo infected the nefarious "Bainesville Ten" group to see recordings of every person who was raped, tortured or killed from their own orders.

Iron Man 2020
During the "Iron Man 2020" event, Ultimo is revealed to be the giant that is attacking the island of Lingares. His attack brings him into conflict with Force Works and the local Deathloks. It was revealed that MODOK Superior was responsible for Ultimo's rampage and the creation of the Deathloks of Lingares, and manipulated Force Works into taking out Ultimo's head so that he can take control of its body and become Ulti-MODOK. After the bearded Deathlok was beheaded by U.S. Agent, War Machine temporarily turned into a Deathlok to control the remaining Deathloks into fighting Ulti-MODOK. When Quake briefly opened a lava-filled chasm, Ulti-MODOK fell in with the Deathloks following him down. War Machine later modified Ultimo and piloted him during the fight against the Extinction Entity. It turns out that the Extinction Entity was just a simulation and was the result of the disease that Arno thought he cured himself of.

Powers and abilities
As a gigantic artificial construction, Ultimo is incredibly strong and nearly indestructible. He can absorb and store immense amounts of heat energy. He can fire beams of concussive force or beams capable of disintegrating matter from his eyes, the power of which varies with his own energy level (but at full power can easily vaporize several dozen tons of rock in a single blast). After Stark-Fujikawa's engineers accessed his systems, he is made to grow to "over a hundred feet" (he stretched along the entire length of the hull of a medium-sized research vessel).

Ultimo has also shown he can adapt his defenses. While he once was deactivated by a lightning bolt, this later proved ineffective.

Finally, he seems capable of repairing himself even when deactivated and completely disassembled.

Ultimo has no capacity for self-motivated activity, and is dependent on programming or the commands of its programmer. Ultimo has a standing order for the combat use of its superhuman powers or, as it was rather graphically put: "If it moves, it dies. If it resists, it dies first."

Other versions
 A modified version of Ultimo exists in the comic book version of the Marvel Cinematic Universe as a creation of Hydra. This version is created from technology that was recovered from Ultron's destroyed sentries after Avengers: Age of Ultron.

In other media

Television
 Ultimo appears in the "Iron Man" segment of The Marvel Super Heroes.
 Ultimo appears in Iron Man, voiced by Ed Gilbert. Similarly to the comics, this version was originally in an inactive volcano before the Mandarin and MODOK find Ultimo and bring it under their control until Force Works defeat it. In a later episode, the Hacker gains control of Ultimo in a failed attempt at seeking revenge on Stark Industries, only for the latter to be defeated by Julia Carpenter and Hawkeye.
 Ultimo makes a cameo appearance in Fantastic Four as part of a show-within-the-show.
 Ultimo appears in Iron Man: Armored Adventures as a Makluan guardian created by the original Mandarin to guard one of his Makluan rings and test potential successors' courage. It also uses power and force to fuel itself and can increase its size whenever someone attacks it. In the episode "Hide and Seek", Gene Khan and Tony Stark claim the ring, but activate Ultimo, who attacks them as part of its test. Tony eventually realizes what the test means and passes by relinquishing his weapons and suit, deactivating the android. In the two-part series finale, "The Makluan Invasion", the Makluan Overlord sends an upgraded version of Ultimo to attack Earth's heroes. During the fight, the Gray Hulk arrives to help them fight it off before Iron Man destroys Ultimo from the inside.
 Ultimo makes a cameo appearance in The Avengers: Earth's Mightiest Heroes episode "Iron Man is Born".
 Ultimo appears in the Avengers Assemble episode "Building the Perfect Weapon" as a servant of the Leader.

Video games
 Ultimo appears as a mini-boss in Marvel: Ultimate Alliance. This version serves the Mandarin.
 Ultimo appears in the Iron Man 2 film tie-in game, voiced by Andrew Chaikin. This version is a large battle suit worn by and fused to Kearson DeWitt of A.I.M., the latter of whom created the suit by stealing and modifying an old version of J.A.R.V.I.S. and combining it with DeWitt's PROTEAN project.
 Ultimo appears in Marvel Pinballs Iron Man table as its wizard mode.
 Ultimo appears as a boss in Marvel Ultimate Alliance 3: The Black Order, voiced by Jim Meskimen. Prior to the game, Iron Man defeated Ultimo and wiped its mechanical mind before storing it in a warehouse in New Jersey. In the present, Ultron uses the Mind Stone to possess Ultimo and wreak havoc on New York City until they are defeated by Scott Lang / Giant-Man and the Vision.

References

External links
 Ultimo at Marvel.com

Characters created by Stan Lee
Comics characters introduced in 1966
Fictional characters with absorption or parasitic abilities
Fictional characters with energy-manipulation abilities
Fictional characters with superhuman durability or invulnerability
Fictional technopaths
Marvel Comics characters who can move at superhuman speeds
Marvel Comics characters with accelerated healing
Marvel Comics characters with superhuman strength
Marvel Comics giants
Marvel Comics robots
Marvel Comics supervillains
Robot supervillains